Antiquarian science books are original historical works (e.g., books or technical papers)  concerning science, mathematics and sometimes engineering. 
These books are important primary references for the study of the history of science and technology, they can provide valuable insights into the historical development of the various fields of scientific inquiry (History of science, History of mathematics, etc.)

The landmark  are significant first (or early) editions typically worth hundreds or thousands of dollars (prices may vary widely based on condition, etc.). 
Reprints of these books are often available, for example from Great Books of the Western World, Dover Publications or Google Books.

Incunabula are extremely rare and valuable, but as the "scientific revolution" is only taken to have started around the 1540s, such works of Renaissance literature (including alchemy, Renaissance magic, etc.) are not usually included under the notion of "scientific" literature. Printed originals of the beginning scientific revolution thus date to the 1540s or later, notably beginning with the original publication of Copernican heliocentrism. Nicolaus Copernicus'  De revolutionibus orbium coelestium of 1543 sold for more than US$2 million at auctions.

List of notable books

16th century
Tartaglia, Niccolò. Nova Scientia (A New Science). Venice, 1537. Ballistics.
Biringuccio, Vannoccio. De la pirotechnia. Venice, 1540. Metallurgy.
Fuchs, Leonhart. De Historia Stirpium Commentarii Insignes. Basel, 1542. Botany.
Copernicus, Nicolaus. De revolutionibus orbium coelestium. Wittenberg, 1543. Copernican heliocentrism.
Vesalius, Andreas. De humani corporis fabrica (On the Structure of the Human Body). Basel, 1543. Anatomy.
Cardano, Gerolamo. Artis magnae sive de regulis algebraicis (The Art of Solving Algebraic Equations). Nuremberg, 1545. Algebra.
Brunfels, Otto. Kreuterbüch, 1546. Botany.
Gessner, Conrad. Historia Animalium 1551-58. Zoology
Bock, Hieronymus. Kreutterbuch. Strasbourg, 1552. Botany.
Paracelsus. Theil der grossen Wundartzney. Frankfurt, 1556. Medicine.
Agricola, Georgius. De re metallica. Basel, 1561. Mineralogy.
Regiomontanus. De triangulis planis et sphaericis libri quinque. Basel, 1561. Trigonometry.
Bombelli, Rafael. Algebra.  1569/1572. Imaginary numbers.
Cesalpino, Andrea. De plantis libri XVI. 1583. Taxonomy.
Bruno, Giordano. De l'infinito, universo e mondi. 1584 Cosmology.
Stevin, Simon. De Thiende. 1585. Decimal numeral system.
Stevin, Simon. De Beghinselen der Weeghconst. 1586. Statics.
Brahe, Tycho. Astronomiae Instauratae Progymnasmata. 1588. Astronomy.
Viète, François. In artem analyticam isagoge (Introduction to the Analytical Art). Tours, 1591. Algebra.
Ruini, Carlo. Anatomia del Cavallo. Venice, 1598. Veterinary medicine.

17th century
Gilbert, William. De Magnete. London, 1600 Magnetism
Galilei, Galileo. Sidereus Nuncius (The Starry Messenger). Frankfurt, 1610. Astronomy
Napier, John. Mirifici Logarithmorum Canonis Descriptio, 1614. Logarithms
Kepler, Johannes. Harmonices Mundi. Linz, 1619. Celestial mechanics
Bacon, Francis. Novum Organum. London, 1620. Experimentation
Galilei, Galileo. Dialogo sopra i due massimi sistemi del mondo Tolemaico, e Coperniciano. Florence, 1632. Heliocentrism
Descartes, René. Discours de la Methode / La Geometrie. Leiden, 1637 Analytical geometry
Fermat, Pierre de. Methodus ad disquirendam maximam et minimam, 1638. Calculus
Galilei, Galileo. Discorsi e dimostrazioni matematiche, intorno a due nuove scienze. Leiden, 1638. Classical dynamics
Desargues, Gérard. Brouillon-project d'une atteinte aux evenemens des rencontres du cone avec un plan, 1639. Projective geometry.
Harvey, William. Exercitatio Anatomica de Motu Cordis et Sanguinis in Animalibus (Anatomical Exercises, Concerning the Heart and Blood)  London, 1653. Circulatory system
Wallis, John. Arithmetica infinitorum, 1655. Calculus
Boyle, Robert. The Sceptical Chymist. London, 1661. Chemistry
Pascal, Blaise. Traitez de l'Equilibre des Liqueurs, et de la Pesanteur de la Masse de l'Air. Paris, 1663. Fluid statics
Gregory, James. Optica Promota, 1663. Optics
Hooke, Robert. Micrographia. London, 1665. Microscopy
Steno, Nicolas. De Solido intra Solidum Naturaliter Contento Dissertationis Prodromus. Florence, 1669. Stratigraphy
Barrow, Isaac. Lectiones geometricae, 1670. Calculus
von Guericke, Otto. Experimenta Nova (ut vocantur) Magdeburgica de Vacuo Spatio. Magdeburger Halbkugeln, 1672. Experimental physics
Huygens, Christiaan. Horologium Oscillatorium. Paris, 1673. Pendulus.
Fermat, Pierre de. Ad locus planos et solidos isagoge, 1679. Analytic geometry
Leibniz, Gottfried. Nova Methodus pro Maximis et Minimis, 1684. Calculus
Newton, Isaac. Philosophiæ Naturalis Principia Mathematica.  London, 3 Vol, 1687. Classical mechanics
Huygens, Christiaan. Traité de la Lumière. Leiden, 1690. Optics
Leibniz, Gottfried Wilhelm. Specimen Dynamicum. Vienna, 1695. Classical mechanics
van Leeuwenhoek, Antonie. Arcana Naturae, Ope & Beneficio Exquisitissimorum Microscopiorum. Leiden, 1696. Microbiology
l'Hôpital, Guillaume de. Analyse des infiniment petits. Paris, 1696. Calculus

18th century
Newton, Isaac (England). Opticks. London, 1704. Optics
Taylor, Brook (England). Methodus Incrementorum Directa et Inversa, 1715. Taylor series
Linnaeus, Carl (Sweden). Systema Naturae. Netherlands, 1735. Linnaean taxonomy
Bernoulli, Daniel (Netherlands). Hydrodynamica. Strasbourg, 1738, Fluid dynamics
d'Alembert, Jean le Rond (France). Réflexions sur la cause générale des vents, 1747. Complex numbers
Euler, Leonhard (Switzerland). Introductio in analysin infinitorum. Lausanne, 1748. Mathematical analysis
Franklin, Benjamin (America). Experiments and Observations on Electricity. London/Philadelphia, 1751. Electricity
Bayes, Thomas (England). An Essay towards solving a Problem in the Doctrine of Chances. London, 1763. Inverse probability
Volta, Alessandro (Italy). De vi attractiva ignis electrici, ac phaenomenis inde pendentibus, 1769. Electricity
Smith, Adam (Scotland). An Inquiry into the Nature and Causes of the Wealth of Nations. London, 2 Vol, 1776. Capitalism
Monge, Gaspard (France). Sur la théorie des déblais et des remblais, 1781. Descriptive geometry.
Lagrange, Joseph (Italy). Mécanique analytique. Paris, 1788. Dynamics
Hutton, James (Scotland). Theory of the Earth. Edinburgh, 1788. Geology
Lavoisier, Antoine (France). Traité Élémentaire de Chimie (Elements of Chemistry). Paris, 2 Vol, 1789. Chemistry
Galvani, Luigi (Italy). De viribus electricitatis in motu musculari commentarius Bologna, 1791. Electricity
Legendre, Adrien-Marie (France). Essai sur la théorie des nombres. Paris, 1798. Number theory
Jenner, Edward (England). An Inquiry into the Causes and Effects of the Variolæ Vaccinæ. 1798. Immunology
Wessel, Caspar (Norway). Om directionens analytiske betegning. Copenhagen, 1799. Imaginary numbers
Ruffini, Paolo (Italy). Teoria generale dele equazioni, in cui si dimostra impossibile. La soluzione algebraica delle equazioni generali di grado superiore al quatro. Bologna, 1799. Algebra

19th century
Gauss, Carl Friedrich (Germany). Disquisitiones Arithmeticae. Leipzig, 1801. Number theory
Young, Thomas (England). Experiments and Calculations Relative to Physical Optics, 1803. Light
Argand, Jean-Robert (Switzerland). Essai sur une maniere de representer les quantities imaginaries dans les constructions geometriques, 1806. Imaginary numbers.
Dalton, John (England). A New System of Chemical Philosophy. London, 1808. Atomic theory
Berzelius, Jöns Jacob (Sweden). Läroboken i kemien, 1808. Chemistry
Cayley, George (England). On Aerial Navigation. Brompton, 3 Vol, 1809. Aeronautics.
Ørsted, Hans Christian (Denmark). Experimenta circa effectum conflictus electrici in acum magneticam. Copenhagen, 1820. Electromagnetism.
Fourier, Joseph (France). Théorie Analytique de la Chaleur. Paris, 1822. Fourier series.
Fresnel, Augustin-Jean (France). Mémoire Sur Un Nouveau Système D'Éclairage Des Phares Lu À L'Académie Des Sciences. Paris, 1822. Wave optics
Babbage, Charles (England). Mr. Babbage's invention: Application of machinery to the purpose of calculating and printing mathematical tables. London, 1823. Computing
Lobachevsky, Nikolai (Russia). Geometriya. 1823. Non-Euclidean geometry
Cauchy, Augustin-Louis (France). Le calcul infinitesimal. Paris, 1823. Mathematical analysis
Carnot, Sadi (France). Réflexions sur la Puissance Motrice du Feu et sur les machines propres à déveloper cette puissance. Paris, 1824. Thermodynamics
Ampère, André-Marie (France). Mémoire sur la théorie mathématique des phénomènes électrodynamiques, 1827. Electromagnetism
Laplace, Pierre-Simon (France). Traité de Mécanique Céleste. Paris, 1827. Classical mechanics
Ohm, Georg (Germany). Die Galvanische Kette mathematisch bearbeitet. Berlin, 1827. Electricity
Lyell, Charles (Scotland). Principles of Geology. London, 1830. Geology
Poisson, Siméon Denis (France). Théorie Mathématique de la Chaleur. Paris, 1835. Heat transfer
Faraday, Michael (England). Experimental Researches in Electricity. London, 1839-55. Electricity.
Babbage, Charles & Lovelace, Ada (England). Sketch of the Analytical Engine invented by Charles Babbage (with additional notes by Augusta Ada, Countess of Lovelace), 1843. Computing
Joule, James P. (England). On the Calorific Effects of Magneto-Electricity, and on the Mechanical Value of Heat. London, 1843. Conservation of energy
Hamilton, William Rowan (Ireland). On Quaternions. London/Edinburgh/Dublin, 1844. Quaternions.
von Helmholtz, Hermann (Germany). Über die Erhaltung der Kraft (On the Conservation of Force). 1847. Conservation of energy
Clausius, Rudolf (Germany). Ueber die bewegende Kraft der Wärme (On the Moving Force of Heat and the Laws of Heat which may be Deduced Therefrom). Leipzig, 1850. Laws of thermodynamics
Thomson, William (1st Baron Kelvin) (Scotland/Ireland). On the dynamical theory of heat, with numerical results deduced from Mr Joule's equivalent of a thermal unit and M. Regnault's observations on steam. Edinburgh, 1851. Thermodynamics
Boole, George (England). An Investigation of the Laws of Thought. London, 1854. Boolean algebra
Maury, Matthew Fontaine (America). The Physical Geography of the Sea. New York, 1855. Oceanography
Virchow, Rudolf (Germany). Die Cellularpathologie in ihrer Begründung auf physiologische und pathologische Gewebelehre. 1858. Cellular pathology
Darwin, Charles (England). On the Origin of Species by Means of Natural Selection. London, 1859. Evolutionary biology
Pasteur, Louis (France). Memoire sur les corpuscules organises qui existent dans l'atmosphere. Paris, 1861. Microbiology.
Lejeune Dirichlet, P. G. (Germany). Vorlesungen über Zahlentheorie. Braunschweig, 1863,  Number theory.
Bernard, Claude (France). Introduction à l'étude de la médecine expérimentale. Paris, 1865. Physiology
Mendel, Gregor (Czech Republic/Austria). Versuche über Pflanzen-Hybriden (Experiments on Plant Hybridization). Brno, 1866. Genetics
Riemann, Bernhard (Germany). Ueber die Hypothesen, welche der Geometrie zu Grunde liegen. Göttingen, 1868. Riemannian geometry
Beltrami, Eugenio (Italy). Saggio di interpretazione della geometria non-euclidea (Essay on an interpretation of non-Euclidean geometry), 1868. Hyperbolic geometry
Galton, Francis (England). Hereditary Genius: An Inquiry into Its Laws and Consequences. London, 1869, Statistics
Cohn, Ferdinand (Poland). Untersuchungen ueber Bacterien. Breslau, 3 Vol, 1870. Bacteriology.
Darwin, Charles (England). The Descent of Man, and Selection in Relation to Sex. London, 1871. Evolutionary biology.
Marx, Karl (Germany). Das Kapital. St. Petersburg, 1872. Economics.
Maxwell, James Clerk (Scotland). A Treatise on Electricity and Magnetism. Oxford, 2 Vol, 1873. Classical electromagnetism.
Koch, Robert (Germany). Untersuchungen uber die aetiologie der wundinfectionskrankheiter. Leipzig, 1878. Bacteriology.
Gibbs, Willard (America). On the Equilibrium of Heterogeneous Substances. New Haven, 1878. Physical chemistry
Michelson, Albert A. (America). Experimental Determination of the Velocity of Light. Annapolis, 1880. Speed of light.
Abel, Niels Henrik (Norway). Oeuvres complètes, 1881. Mathematical analysis.
Zhukovsky, Nikolai (Russia). O protchnosti dvizheniya (The Durability of Motion). Moscow, 1882. Aeronautics.
Cantor, Georg (Russia/Germany). Grundlagen einer allgemeinen Mannigfaltigkeitslehre. Leipzig, 1883. Set theory.
James, William (America). The Principles of Psychology. New York, 1890. Psychology
Mendeleev, Dmitri (Russia). Principles of Chemistry. London, 1891. Chemistry
Newcomb, Simon (America). Astronomical Papers Prepared for the Use of the American Ephemeris and Nautical Almanac. Washington, D.C., 1891. Astronomy
Poincare, Henri (France). Les méthodes nouvelles de la mécanique céleste. Paris, 1892. Celestial mechanics
Tesla, Nikola (Croatia/America). Experiments with Alternate Currents of High Potential and High Frequency. New York, 1892. Electricity
Hertz, Heinrich (Germany). Untersuchungen über die Ausbreitung der elektrischen Kraft (Electric Waves). 1893. Electromagnetic radiation
Röntgen, Wilhelm (Germany). Ueber eine neue Art von Strahlen (On A New Kind Of Rays). 1895. X-rays
Bolyai, János (Hungary). The Science of Absolute Space. 1896. Non-Euclidean geometry
Galois, Évariste (France). Oeuvres Mathematiques d'Évariste Galois. Paris, 1897. Group theory
Curie, Marie (Poland/France) & Curie, Pierre (France). Sur une nouvelle substance fortement radio-active, contenue dans la pechblende  (Comptes Rendus Hebdomadaires des Séances de l'Académie des Sciences). Paris, 1898. Radioactivity
Hilbert, David (Germany). Grundlagen der Geometrie (The Foundations of Geometry). 1899. Mathematics
Ramón y Cajal, Santiago (Spain). Textura del sistema nervioso del hombre y los vertebrados 1899-1904. Neuroscience

20th century (pre-Cold War)
Planck, Max (Germany). Zur Theorie des Gesetzes der Energieverteilung im Normalspectrum. Leipzig, 1900. Quantum mechanics
Tsiolkovsky, Konstantin Eduardovich (Russia). The Exploration of Cosmic Space by Means of Reaction Devices. Kaluga, 1903. Rockets
Rutherford, Ernest (New Zealand). Radio-activity. Cambridge, 1904. Nuclear physics
Lorentz, Hendrik (Netherlands). Electromagnetic phenomena in a system moving with any velocity smaller than that of light. Amsterdam, 1904. Special relativity
Einstein, Albert (Germany). Zur Elektrodynamik bewegter Körper ("On the Electrodynamics of Moving Bodies") Leipzig, 1905. Special relativity
Einstein, Albert (Germany). Does the Inertia of a Body Depend Upon Its Energy Content? Leipzig, 1905. Physics
Richardson, Lewis (England). The Approximate Arithmetical Solution by Finite Differences of Physical Problems Involving Differential Equations, with an Application to the Stresses in a Masonry Dam. London, 1910. Computational mechanics
Boas, Franz (Germany/America). The Mind of Primitive Man. New York, 1911. Anthropology
Bohr, Niels (Denmark). On the Constitution of Atoms and Molecules. London, 1913. Quantum mechanics
Einstein, Albert (Germany). Die Grundlage Der Allgemeinen Relativitätstheorie (Foundations of the General Theory of Relativity). Leipzig, 1916. Physics.
Goddard, Robert Hutchings (America). A Method of Reaching Extreme Altitudes. Washington, D.C, 1919. Rockets
de Broglie, Louis (France). Recherches sur la théorie des quanta (Research on Quantum Theory), 1924. Wave-particle duality
Whitehead, Alfred North  (England) and Russell, Bertrand (England). Principia Mathematica. Cambridge, 1925. Mathematics
Heisenberg, Werner (Germany). Über quantentheorestische Umdeutung kinematischer und mechanischer Beziehungen. Berlin, 1925. Quantum mechanics
Schrödinger, Erwin (Austria). Quantisierung als Eigenwertproblem. Leipzig, 1926. Quantum mechanics
Heisenberg, Werner (Germany). Über den anschaulichen Inhalt der quantentheoretischen Kinematik und Mechanik Berlin, 1927. Quantum mechanics
Pavlov, Ivan (Russia). Conditioned Reflexes. New York, 1928. Classical conditioning
Oberth, Hermann (Romania). Wege zur Raumschiffahrt (Ways to Spaceflight). Munich/Berlin, 1929. Rockets
Hubble, Edwin (America). A Relation between Distance and Radial Velocity among Extra-Galactic Nebulae. Washington, D.C., 1929. Astrophysics
Dirac, Paul (England). The Principles of Quantum Mechanics. Oxford, 1930. Quantum mechanics.
Gödel, Kurt (Czech Republic/America). On formally undecidable propositions of Principia Mathematica and related systems. Leipzig, 1931. Mathematical logic.
von Neumann, John (Hungary/America). Mathematische Grundlagen der Quantenmechanik.  1932. Quantum mechanics
Goddard, Robert Hutchings (America). Liquid Propellant Rocket Development. Washington, D.C., 1936. Rockets
Keynes, John Maynard (England). The General Theory of Employment, Interest and Money. London, 1936. Economics
Church, Alonzo (America). A Note on the Entscheidungsproblem. Ann Arbor, 1936. Computer science.
Turing, Alan (England). On Computable Numbers, with an Application to the Entscheidungsproblem. Cambridge, 1937. Computing
Dobzhansky, Theodosius (Ukraine/America). Genetics and the Origin of Species. 1937. Evolutionary biology
Shannon, Claude E. (America). A Symbolic Analysis of Relay and Switching Circuits (Master's thesis, MIT). 1937. Computing
Pauling, Linus (America). The Nature of the Chemical Bond. Ithaca, 1939. Chemistry.
von Neumann, John (Hungary/America) & Morgenstern, Oskar (Germany/America). Theory of Games and Economic Behavior. Princeton, 1944. Game theory

References

External links
Heralds of Science - Smithsonian Libraries
Milestones of Science Books - Antiquarian booksellers

History of science
History of mathematics
Engineering literature
Lists of publications in science
Science books
Mathematics books
Book collecting
Books by type